IBS may stand for:

Academia and education 
 Indiana Boys School, a former name of Plainfield Juvenile Correctional Facility
 Institute for Basic Science, a research institute in Daejeon, South Korea
 Institute of Bangladesh Studies, a research institute in Rajshahi University
 International Bilingual School, a former Japanese private school in the Los Angeles area
 International Biometric Society, an academic statistical association for mathematical and statistical methods in the biosciences 
 International Business School, Budapest, a partnership with Oxford Brookes University based in Hungary dating from 1991
 International Business School, Germany, a private institution of post-secondary education located in Nuremberg
 Iowa Braille School
 International Boys' Schools Coalition

Associations 
 Institute of Broadcast Sound, a UK broadcasting professional association
 , the Institute for Structural Research in Warsaw, Poland
 Intercollegiate Broadcasting System, an organization of non-profit, education-affiliated radio stations
 International Bible Society, a former name of Biblica, a group that translates and publishes the Bible
 International Boy Scouts, Troop 1, a historic Boy Scout Group in Japan

Business 
 International Builders' Show, an annual trade show organized by the National Association of Home Builders
 International Business Systems, a supply chain management company
 Internet Broadcasting, a web design firm focused on broadcast television

Fiction 
 IBS, a satirical news channel on the BBC's programme Broken News
 International Brotherhood of Stevedores, a dockworkers union in season two of the TV show The Wire

Medical 
 Ichthyosis bullosa of Siemens, a genetic skin disorder
 Irritable bowel syndrome, a disorder of the bowel

Science and technology 
 Ideal Body Size, a component of the figure rating scale
 Identical By State, a genetic term also known as non-identical by type (NIBT)
 Instruction-based sampling, an implementation of a hardware performance counter used to collect performance data in a superscalar microprocessor
 Integrated bridge system, a navigation related system on ships
 Intrabeam scattering, a collective effect arising in high-intensity particle beams
 Ion-beam sputtering, a type of sputter deposition
 Iron-based superconductor
 Israel Broadcasting Service, former (1951–1965) name of the Israel Broadcasting Authority

Other uses 
 Iman Budhi Santosa, an Indonesian poet
 Industrialised Building System (IBS), a term used in Malaysia for a technique of construction
Inflatable Boat, Small